Hormozabad (also Romanized as Hormozābād; also known as Hormoz and Hormuz) is a village in Eslamiyeh Rural District, in the Central District of Rafsanjan County, Kerman Province, Iran. At the 2006 census, its population was 2,302, in 543 families.

References 

Populated places in Rafsanjan County